Portugal participated in the Eurovision Song Contest 1998 in Birmingham. Alma Lusa represented Portugal with the song "Se eu te pudesse abracar".

Before Eurovision

Festival da Canção 1998 
Festival da Canção 1998 was the 35th edition of the festival, and was used to select the 34th Portuguese entry at the Eurovision Song Contest.

Final 
The final was held at the Teatro São Luiz in Lisbon on 7 March 1998, hosted by Lucia Moniz and Carlos Ribeiro. Eight songs competed in the contest, with the winner selected by the votes of an "expert" jury. The winner was Alma Lusa with "Se eu te pudesse abracar". Alma Lusa were a short-lived Portuguese musical group, set up specifically to participate in Portugal's Eurovision Song Contest selection (Festival da Canção) in 1998. The group consisted of vocalist Inês Santos and musicians José Cid, Carlos Jesus, Henrique Lopes, Carlos Ferreirinha and Pedro Soares.

At Eurovision 
Heading into the final of the contest, BBC reported that bookmakers ranked the entry joint 12th out of the 25 entries. In Birmingham, Portugal scored 36 points placing 12th.

Voting

References

1998
Countries in the Eurovision Song Contest 1998
Eurovision